Travis Robert Burns (born 23 April 1991) is an Australian actor and model. He first came to prominence with his role in the American action-drama television series, SAF3 (2013). He played Tyler Brennan in the long-running Australian television soap opera Neighbours from 2015 to 2018. After leaving Neighbours, Burns starred in the romance film Sunrise in Heaven (2019) and television films The Wrong Boy Next Door (2019), The Christmas Listing (2020), and Save the Wedding (2021).

Career

Acting
Burns' first acting role was in SAF3, an American action-drama television series which follows the daily challenges of the Sea, Air, and Fire ("SAF") divisions of the Malibu Fire Department. Burns stars throughout the series as lifeguard Chase Robertson, appearing in eight episodes of the drama. SAF3 was primarily filmed in South African locations such as Cape Town and Camps Bay Beach, and the series premiered on The CW in September 2013. He later relocated to the United States as to further his career in acting, having auditioned for roles in films such as The Fault in Our Stars (2014), and Terminator Genisys (2015), albeit the aspiring actor was unsuccessful.

On 30 October 2014, the Neighbours official website announced that Burns had been cast as Tyler Brennan, the younger brother of established character Mark Brennan (Scott McGregor). Burns, who was based in the United States at the time, was asked to audition for the part in early 2014. After securing the role, Burns relocated back to Australia. Of his casting, he said: "When you score a role on a show as iconic as Neighbours, you don't say no. It's especially cool to be joining the show in its 30th–anniversary year. I feel like I've arrived at the perfect time." Burns had previously met McGregor through their modelling agency and believed that they had developed a "brotherly spark" through that connection, which he felt helped him secure the role. He also believed the role was meant to be his as his young nephew also shares the name Tyler. Burns made his screen debut as Tyler on 6 February 2015. Burns' partner, Emma Lane, portrayed Courtney Grixti from 2015 to 2018, a recurring character in the series. The two characters were romantically linked during the series' 32nd season. Complementing his role in Neighbours, Burns has appeared as Tyler in three spin–offs of the series; Summer Stories, Pipe Up, and Neighbours vs Time Travel.

In December 2017, Fiona Byrne of the Herald Sun reported that Burns would be leaving Neighbours in the coming months to pursue other acting roles in the United States. His exit scenes aired on 27 February 2018, but he reprised the role for a brief return in October 2018. Following his exit from Neighbours, Burns made a short film with his former co-star Felix Mallard called Money Is Just a Barbell. Burns appears in the 2019 romance drama film Sunrise in Heaven, which was adapted from Jan Gilbert Hurst's novel His Sunrise My Sunset. That same year, Burns starred in The Wrong Boy Next Door on Lifetime Movie Network, alongside Vivica A. Fox who also produced the film. 

Also in 2019, Burns played Prince Jack in A Christmas Princess, alongside Shein Mompremier. In 2020, Burns starred in The Christmas Listing, his second holiday film and the first to air on Lifetime. The following year, he starred in romance film Save the Wedding with Kacey Landoll. He also appears in Jacob Johnston's horror thriller Dreamcatcher. The film features an ensemble cast, including Zachary Gordon, whose characters attempt to avenge the death of their friend at a music festival, but find themselves being stalked by the same killer.

Modelling
Aside from acting, Burns is a model by profession. In September 2015, Burns was featured naked in a Cosmopolitan magazine centrefold, as part of Neighbours 30th anniversary celebrations, but also to raise funds for cancer research. Later that month, Burns was listed as one of Cleo magazine's top–30 "Bachelor of the Year" nominees for 2015.

Personal life
Burns was born on 23 April 1991, in Bacchus Marsh, a regional centre of Victoria, Australia. Burns has been in a relationship with model, actress and fellow Neighbours star, Emma Lane, since 2013; in March 2016, the couple announced their engagement. They married on 16 December 2017 on the Bellarine Peninsula.

Filmography

References

External links 

1991 births
Living people
Male actors from Victoria (Australia)
Australian male soap opera actors
21st-century Australian male actors
Australian male models